Ahmad of Shirvan was the eighth Shah of Shirvan and fourth Shah of Layzan. His throne was contested by his brother Tabarsaranshah Haytham ibn Muhammad, who later attacked Shirvan with the Sallarid ruler Ibrahim I in 968, in order to reaffirm Sallarid authority over Shirvan, forcing the Shirvanshah to pay him tribute, then he escaped to Darband and marched with local rulers to Shirvan but he eventually defeated by native people and retreated to Tabarsaran. Ahmad was succeeded by Muhammad.

References

10th-century rulers in Asia